Michael Franks: Original Album Series is a music box set by jazz musician Michael Franks, first released in 2010 in the United Kingdom as part of Rhino's Original Album Series. It includes five of his earlier studio albums in cardboard sleeves, from The Art of Tea (1976) to One Bad Habit (1980).

The CDs are reissues of the originals, without remasters or bonus tracks.

Track listing

Reception

Andy Kellman of AllMusic commented "[t]hese albums are among Franks' best work; the fourth and fifth albums don't rate with the first three, but they do have their moments."

References

Bibliography
 

Michael Franks (musician) compilation albums
Rhino Entertainment compilation albums
2010 compilation albums